Howard Earl Freigau (August 1, 1902 – July 18, 1932), nicknamed "Ty", was an American professional baseball third baseman and shortstop. He played seven seasons in Major League Baseball (MLB) between 1922 and 1928 for the St. Louis Cardinals, Chicago Cubs, Brooklyn Robins, and Boston Braves. The ,  Freigau batted and threw right-handed.

Freigau attended Ohio Wesleyan University, alma mater of Branch Rickey, the manager of the Cardinals during Freigau's tenure in St. Louis. On May 23, 1925, Rickey traded Freigau to the Cubs in a deal to obtain starting catcher Bob O'Farrell, and the third baseman went on to post his most successful season, batting .299 (including .307 as a Cub) and posting career highs in hits (150), home runs (8) and runs batted in (71). He divided his  season, his last in the Majors, between Brooklyn and Boston and played in 69 games before returning to the minor leagues for the rest of his abbreviated career.

In July 1932, when playing for the Knoxville Smokies of the Southern Association, Freigau went for an evening swim in Chattanooga, Tennessee. He dove headfirst into the shallow end of a swimming pool, broke his neck, and drowned at the age of 29.

Freigau's 537 big-league hits included 99 doubles and 25 triples, as well as 15 home runs.

References

External links

1902 births
1932 deaths
Accidental deaths in Tennessee
Baseball players from Dayton, Ohio
Boston Braves players
Brooklyn Robins players
Buffalo Bisons (minor league) players
Chicago Cubs players
Deaths by drowning in the United States
Indianapolis Indians players
Kansas City Blues (baseball) players
Knoxville Smokies players
Major League Baseball shortstops
Major League Baseball third basemen
Mobile Marines players
Ohio Wesleyan Battling Bishops baseball players
St. Louis Cardinals players
Syracuse Stars (minor league baseball) players
Toledo Mud Hens players